Anna Rose Fraser-Sproule (born July 25, 1963) is a Canadian freestyle skier. 

She competed at the FIS Freestyle World Ski Championships 1986 in Tignes, where she won a silver medal in combined, and placed fourth in aerials, sixth in ski ballet, and 22nd in moguls.

She took part in aerials at the 1988 Winter Olympics in Calgary, where freestyle skiing was a demonstration sport.

References

External links 
 

1963 births
Living people
Canadian female freestyle skiers
Skiers from Vancouver